War is Over. Please Forget... is a 1997 Russian drama with elements of documentary that unfolds against the backdrop of the First Chechen War.

Plot 
The main character is a simple Russian woman. Her son is in the army. The Chechen war begins. His mother is concerned about the lack of reports on his son. While she only realizes that the boy in the war. Next, she tries to learn something and get him out of that hell. The move started up all possible and impossible means: prayer, attempt to bribe, senseless apartments for sale. Suddenly, the son returns, but at a deserter will soon come, and could go no farther ... The film is made on the material on the war in Chechnya, involving unique combat chronicles of the archives of the FSB and other special services. At the end of the film is a complete list of Russian soldiers killed in the Chechen war (in 2939 established names), and the text, in which the authors ask for forgiveness from the Soldiers' Mothers, whose children were in the fields of war, because they dared to touch this topic. The last film role of Zinovy Gerdt.

The film was forbidden to be shown on television.

Cast 
 Aleksey Dyakov as   Dima  
  Irina Brazgovka  as  Dima's mother     
  Svetlana Smekhnova
 Zinovy Gerdt (last role)
 Aleksandr    Pavlov as   General 
 Aleksandr Mokhov as  delivery of humanitarian aid 
 Alyona Grigorieva
 Aleksandr Pankratov-Chyorny   as  cameo 
 Boris Khmelnitsky as  cameo 
 Stanislav Govorukhin as  cameo 
 Vladimir Posner as  cameo 
 Galina Shergova as  cameo 
Valeri Yanklovich

Awards
 1998 —  Prize Nika Award —  nominated for Best Actress (Irina Brazgovka)
  1998 — Prize of the Guild of Russian filmmakers (film)
  1998 — Jury Prize-governmental Organizations (Brazgovka)
  1998 — Prize NTV-Kino (Brazgovka)
  1998 —    IFF   Stalker

References

External links 
 War is Over. Please Forget... at the Internet Movie Database

1997 films
1990s war drama films
Prisoner of war films
Chechen wars films
Russian war drama films
Films scored by Eduard Artemyev
1997 drama films
1990s Russian-language films